Guillaume Bieganski (3 November 1932 – 8 October 2016) was a French association football defender of Polish origin.

References

External links
 
 
 Guillaume Bieganski at RC Lens 
 
 
 
 
 

1932 births
2016 deaths
French footballers
French people of Polish descent
France international footballers
Association football defenders
Ligue 1 players
Lille OSC players
RC Lens players
1954 FIFA World Cup players
Marignane Gignac Côte Bleue FC players
Sportspeople from Pas-de-Calais
Footballers from Hauts-de-France